Aly Yirango (born 4 January 1994) is a Malian professional footballer who plays as a goalkeeper for  club Versailles. He has won two caps with the Mali national team.

Club career
Born in Bamako, Yirango has played club football for Djoliba, Marseille B, and Guingamp B.

In August 2018, Yirango joined Boulogne. He left the club at the end of the season.

International career 
He made his senior international debut for Mali in 2015. He was a squad member at the 2013 Africa Cup of Nations.

Honours 
Versailles

 Championnat National 2: 2021–22

References

External links

1994 births
Living people
Sportspeople from Bamako
Association football goalkeepers
Malian footballers
Mali international footballers
Djoliba AC players
Olympique de Marseille players
En Avant Guingamp players
Stade Briochin players
US Boulogne players
US Lusitanos Saint-Maur players
FC Versailles 78 players
Championnat National 2 players
Championnat National 3 players
Championnat National players
Malian expatriate footballers
Malian expatriate sportspeople in France
Expatriate footballers in France
2013 Africa Cup of Nations players
21st-century Malian people